Régional was a subsidiary airline wholly owned by Air France which connected hubs at Paris, Lyon to 49 airports in Europe. The airline operated in Air France livery, retaining its name in small titles and logo on the front fuselage and engines. It became the first European operator of the Embraer E190 aircraft in November 2006. It was headquartered in Bouguenais at the Nantes Atlantique Airport.

The airline, along with Brit Air and Airlinair, was fully merged in HOP! since 2017 after a year of negotiation process.

History 
On 30 March 2001, Flandre Air, Proteus Airlines, and Regional Airlines merged into Régional.

Régional as of 2006 was upgrading and consolidating its fleet, considering to ally with a turboprop partner as it increasingly turned its focus to its jet operations. The two remaining Saab 2000s were phased out in 2006 and the last of its nine Embraer EMB-120s followed in 2008, marking the exit of all of Régional's turboprop aircraft.

From 31 March 2013, Régional services were operated under the HOP! brand. Régional ceased all flight operations in March 2017 after its merger in HOP!.

Destinations

Fleet 

 
The Régional fleet includes the following aircraft in March 2013, the average fleet age is 12.3 years.

It became the first European operator of the Embraer E190 on 23 November 2006, when the first of six on order was delivered. The 100-seat aircraft would operate domestic and intra-European services in full Air France colours. Régional received its first Embraer E170 of 6 orders, which wears the new Régional logo, on September 2, 2008.

The Embraer E190s are part of a new order over the Air France-KLM group with another 18 further options. All Fokkers have been transferred to KLM Cityhopper. The last propeller aircraft Embraer EMB-120 left the fleet on October 10, 2008, replaced by the ERJ-135.

Head office

The head office of the airline was located on the grounds of Nantes Atlantique Airport in Bouguenais, near Nantes. The head office was adjacent to the airport hotels. Nantes Atlantique Airport had the head office of Regional Airlines, the largest of the three companies that were merged into the new Régional.

Incidents and accidents
On 25 January 2007, Air France Flight 7775 from Pau to Paris, operated by Régional, crashed shortly after take-off. All 54 passengers and crew escaped from the Fokker 100 although one person was killed on the ground. An investigation by the BEA revealed that the cause of the accident was ice on the wings of the aircraft involved.

References

External links

Régional 
Régional  (archive)
 Flight 7775 Reports
 Final  (Archive)
 Preliminary  (Archive)

Defunct airlines of France
European Regions Airline Association
Airlines established in 2001
Air France–KLM
Airlines disestablished in 2017
Former SkyTeam affiliate members
French companies established in 2001
French companies disestablished in 2017